Brijlal Biyani (1896–1968) was an Indian independence activist and writer. He grew up in the Akola district of Maharashtra and studied at the Morris College in Nagpur. Biyani joined the Non-Cooperation Movement in 1920. His participation in the Dahihanda Salt Satyagraha, Jungle Satyagraha and the struggle against Nizam led to him being sentenced to jail four times.

He was a first elected as M. L. C., as the member of Third Legislative Council of Central Provinces and Berar during 1927–1930.

Post-Independence, Biyani served as the Finance Minister of then Madhya Pradesh State and later represented Akola constituency.

He was later elected to Legislative Assembly of Bombay State in 1957 elections from Mangrulpir and was MLA in first assembly of Maharshtra State.

He was married at a very young age to Savitri. His daughter Sarla Birla was married to Basant Kumar Birla, son of Indian businessman Ghanshyam Das Birla in April 1941.

The Brijlal Biyani Science College at Amravati is named after him. The Government of India issued a postage stamp in his honor in 2002.

References 

Indian independence activists from Maharashtra
People from Akola district
1896 births
1968 deaths
Members of the Constituent Assembly of India
Maharashtra MLAs 1960–1962
Madhya Pradesh MLAs 1952–1957
Prisoners and detainees of British India
Founders of Indian schools and colleges
Gandhians
Bombay State MLAs 1957–1960